Lamin Suma (born 14 July 1991) is a Sierra Leonean footballer who plays as a midfielder for Stumptown Athletic in the National Independent Soccer Association.

Club career
Born in Freetown, he was playing with Mighty Blackpool F.C. until summer 2011 when he moved to another Sierra Leone National Premier League side FC Kallon.

In November 2011 he went to Turkey where he joined Süper Lig side Eskişehirspor on trials.  He developed a good relation with club's coach Michael Skibbe and the prospects of Suma getting a contract looked good, however the sudden departure of Skibbe from Eskişehirspor left Suma with his future uncertain and Serbian side FK Jagodina moved in and offered him a contract.

Lamin Suma made his Serbian SuperLiga debut on March 31, 2012, as a substitute in a 21-round match visiting FK Vojvodina, a 0-0 draw.  He made a total of 3 appearances in the 2011–12 Serbian SuperLiga.  In August 2012 he agreed to a loan to Montenegrin First League side FK Jedinstvo Bijelo Polje where he played the 2012–13 season.

In summer 2013 he moved to Estonia and joined Meistriliiga side FC Flora Tallinn. In 2014, he moved to Finnish third-tier side Atlantis FC.

After playing in Europe, Suma moved across the Atlantic to the United States and joined SGFC Eagles Maryland in 2015, a semi professional side playing in American Soccer League, in March 2016, he signed a short-term deal until summer with Philadelphia Fury. Philadelphia Fury ended the season as champions, and Suma won the best player award of the 2016 Spring season of the American Soccer League. As result, Suma signed with Sacramento Republic FC on December 5, 2016, a club playing a level higher, in the United Soccer League.

On 21 December 2017, Suma signed with USL side Fresno FC ahead of their inaugural season in the league.

National team
Lamin Suma has played for all categories of the Sierra Leonian youth national team, namely, the U-17, U-20 and U-23 teams. He was the captain of the Sierra Leone U-20 team.  On May 19, 2011, he received a call by Christian Cole to the Sierra Leone national football team however he was later dropped by Lars Matsson.

Personal life
Lamin Suma is the younger brother of Sheriff Suma, also a footballer.

References

External sources
 Profile at FK Jagodina official website
 Lamin Suma at Srbijafudbal

1991 births
Living people
Sportspeople from Freetown
Sierra Leonean footballers
Sierra Leonean expatriate footballers
Association football midfielders
Mighty Blackpool players
F.C. Kallon players
FK Jagodina players
Serbian SuperLiga players
Expatriate footballers in Serbia
Sierra Leonean expatriate sportspeople in Serbia
FK Jedinstvo Bijelo Polje players
Expatriate footballers in Montenegro
Sierra Leonean expatriate sportspeople in Montenegro
FC Flora players
Esiliiga players
Meistriliiga players
Expatriate footballers in Estonia
Sierra Leonean expatriate sportspeople in Estonia
Expatriate footballers in Finland
Sierra Leonean expatriate sportspeople in Finland
Sacramento Republic FC players
Fresno FC players
Expatriate soccer players in the United States
Sierra Leonean expatriate sportspeople in the United States
Philadelphia Fury players
Stumptown AC players
National Independent Soccer Association players
Mqabba F.C. players
Expatriate footballers in Malta
Sierra Leonean expatriate sportspeople in Malta